The Buffalo, Bradford and Pittsburgh Railroad was formed on February 26, 1859, by the merger of the Buffalo and Pittsburgh Railroad and the Buffalo and Bradford Railroad. The Buffalo, Bradford and Pittsburgh Railroad was leased to the Erie Railroad on January 6, 1866, for period of 499 years. It was most commonly known as the Bradford Branch of the Erie.

The main line ran  from Carrollton, NY to Gilesville, PA.

External links

Western New York Railroad Archive - Buffalo, Bradford and Pittsburgh Railroad

Predecessors of the Erie Railroad
Defunct New York (state) railroads
Defunct Pennsylvania railroads
Railway companies established in 1859
Railway companies disestablished in 1941
1859 establishments in New York (state)
American companies established in 1859